Don Bosco Anthony Boselli Jr. (born April 17, 1972) is an American former professional football player who was a tackle in the National Football League (NFL) for seven seasons with the Jacksonville Jaguars. He played college football for the  USC Trojans, earning three first-team All-American selections. Boselli was the first player drafted by the Jaguars, who selected him second overall in the 1995 NFL Draft.

During his tenure in Jacksonville, Boselli established himself as one of the franchise's most productive and popular players. He was named to five Pro Bowls and three first-team All-Pros while appearing in two AFC Championship Games. In 2002, he was the first selection in the Houston Texans' expansion draft, but retired without playing for them due to injuries. His accomplishments with Jacksonville led to him becoming the first inductee of the Jaguars' Hall of Fame, which he was named to in 2006. Boselli was inducted to the College Football Hall of Fame in 2014 and the Pro Football Hall of Fame in 2022, making him the first Jaguars player inducted to the latter.

College career
Boselli accepted an athletic scholarship to attend the University of Southern California, where he played for the Trojans from 1991 to 1994.  He was a first-team All-Pac-10 selection and a first-team All-American in 1992, 1993 and 1994.  In 1994, he also won the Morris Trophy.  While he was an undergraduate, he was initiated as a member of the Sigma Alpha Epsilon fraternity. Boselli was named to the College Football Hall of Fame in 2014.

Professional career

Boselli was selected as the second pick of the 1995 NFL Draft, the first-ever draft pick of the new Jacksonville Jaguars franchise.  As a result of his professional success and local popularity, Jacksonville-area McDonald's restaurants offered the "Boselli Burger" in his honor for a period of time.

He was selected by the Houston Texans in the 2002 expansion draft. He spent the entire season on injured reserve and retired following the conclusion of the season. Boselli has blamed the end of his career on mistakes made during a surgery on his left shoulder.

As a sign of his success in Jacksonville, on October 8, 2006, he was the first player inducted into the Pride of the Jaguars (the team's Hall of Fame) and signed a symbolic one-day contract allowing him to retire officially as a Jaguar. Boselli was inducted to the Pro Football Hall of Fame on February 10, 2022, becoming the first Jaguars player to receive the honor.

Life after football
Boselli participated in numerous business ventures during and after his professional football career. Along with former teammates Mark Brunell and Bryan Schwartz, he invested in seven Mattress Firm bedding stores in Jacksonville. By the time Boselli left for Texas in 2002, he had sold his interest in the company. Boselli and Brunell own all Whataburger franchise locations in the Jacksonville area. He also works as the offensive line coach at the Episcopal School of Jacksonville, on the same coaching staff as Brunell.

Boselli is also a founding partner in IF Marketing with friends and former teammates Jeff Novak and Will Furrer. The marketing and advertising firm, with offices in Georgetown, Texas and Jacksonville, Florida, was originally called Intra Focus marketing & advertising.

Personal life
Since 2005, Boselli has lived in Ponte Vedra Beach, Florida with his wife, Angi and their five children, Andrew, Adam, Ashli, Alexis, and Ansli. Boselli has lost a significant amount of weight and now participates in triathlons.

Boselli's son Andrew received an athletic scholarship to attend Florida State University, and played for the Florida State Seminoles football team.

Sports broadcasting
In 2007, Boselli was hired as a color commentator on regional NFL telecasts for Fox, teaming with Ron Pitts.  In his rookie season as a televised commentator, Boselli drew praise as one of the best in the business.
From 2009-2012, he worked as a game analyst and sideline reporter for Westwood One's coverage of the NFL.
Beginning in 2013, he joined the Jacksonville Jaguars radio play by play team.

Boselli was a former co-host on 1010 XL with Dan Hicken and Jeff Prosser each morning from 6-10 am on Sports Final Radio. He still appears part-time as a call-in guest.

Boselli was interviewed for an episode of NFL's Greatest Games which aired on ESPN2.

Charity
Boselli and his wife created the Boselli Foundation in 1995 in Jacksonville to work with at-risk youth, and help them to cultivate high self-esteem and to succeed at home, at school, and at play. Beginning in 2007, he has spent substantial time working on projects with the foundation. He overcame opposition from local politicians when the Boselli Foundation proposed renovating and reopening a closed community center.

References

External links
 The Boselli Foundation

1972 births
Living people
All-American college football players
American Conference Pro Bowl players
American football offensive tackles
College football announcers
College Football Hall of Fame inductees
Pro Football Hall of Fame inductees
Jacksonville Jaguars players
Houston Texans players
Jacksonville Jaguars announcers
National Football League announcers
Players of American football from Colorado
Sportspeople from Boulder, Colorado
Players of American football from Jacksonville, Florida
USC Trojans football players
Ed Block Courage Award recipients
National Football League players with retired numbers